Polarity is the third studio album by the American death metal band Decrepit Birth.
 
A music video for the song "The Resonance" was filmed, and is the band's first music video. It was directed by Ann Christin "Anki" Rihm. The artwork for Polarity was made by Dan Seagrave, who also has made the artwork for the band's first two studio albums.

Track listing
 "(A Departure of the Sun) Ignite the Tesla Coil" – 6:33
 "Metatron" – 4:13
 "The Resonance" – 3:42
 "Polarity" – 4:26
 "Solar Impulse" – 2:52
 "Mirroring Dimensions" – 3:36
 "A Brief Odyssey in Time" – 1:01
 "The Quickening of Time" – 2:42
 "Sea of Memories" – 2:25
 "Symbiosis" – 4:23
 "Darkness Embrace" – 2:25

Credits

Personnel
 Bill Robinson - vocals
 Matt Sotelo - guitar
 Joel Horner - bass
 KC Howard - drums
 Dan Eggers - guitar solos on "The Quickening of Time", "Symbiosis", and "Polarity"
 Lee Smith - drums on "Sea of memories", and "Darkness Embrace"
 Ty Oliver - guitar solo on "Solar Impulse"

Production
Drum tracking by Zack Ohren at Shark Bite Studios
All guitar, bass, vocals, and keys tracked at Legion Recording Studio
Mixing by Zack Ohren and Matt Sotelo at Castle Ultimate Studios
Mastering by Jamal Ruhe at West West Side Studios

References

2010 albums
Nuclear Blast albums
Decrepit Birth albums
Albums with cover art by Dan Seagrave